The Hard Way is a 1991 American buddy cop comedy film directed by John Badham, starring Michael J. Fox, James Woods, Stephen Lang, and Annabella Sciorra. LL Cool J played his first fictional character in the picture, which for this reason has been referred to as his acting debut.

In the film, a popular actor in search of credibility (Fox) uses his clout to become the partner of a streetwise cop with relationship problems (Woods), amidst the exactions of an elusive serial killer, "The Party Crasher" (Lang), who has vowed to clean up the streets of New York by executing various disenfranchised people in public.

Plot

Serial killer, the "Party Crasher" notifies the police before he kills another person at a night club, daring them to stop him. Converging on the club, the officers, including cynical NYPD Lieutenant John Moss, cannot stop the murder of a local drug dealer. The perp flees in the chaos, and Moss narrowly misses catching him. As Moss's injuries are tended, he mouths off on camera.

Nick Lang is an entitled Hollywood movie star, known as "Smoking" Joe Gunn, the Indiana Jones-like title character in a series of highly popular action films. Vying for the lead in the cop drama Blood on the Asphalt, he vows to "prepare" for the role by posing as a police officer with the NYPD.

Impressed by Moss's outburst on television, Nick pulls strings with NYC Mayor David Dinkins to be assigned as Moss's new partner. Moss is forced to comply by his captain, a Nick Lang fan. Doing so, he is off the Party Crasher case at risk of being fired if he disobeys.

Moss defies orders, continuing the investigation and repeatedly trying to ditch Nick, who annoys him with constant questions and attempts to mimic him. Wanting to understand what it is like to be a cop, Moss reminds him this is not a movie.

Meanwhile, Moss is also trying to juggle a new romance with single mother Susan. Divorced, he has difficulty opening up, so Nick offers him advice. Moss is embarrassed even further when Nick, as Ray Casanov, appears at a pizza parlor and is a hit.

Moss tries to have a Nick-free day by handcuffing him to his bed with a note, ordering him to stay. When Susan invites Nick by phone to eat out, he somehow unshackles himself. Riding the subway Nick mistakenly believes Susan is infatuated with him. He later stands up to a group of delinquent juveniles, as a cop. Moss, goes to the subway station and arrests the perps.

As Moss has decided that he no longer cares about the consequences, increasingly frustrated with Nick’s presence in his life, he takes Nick to a dark building to catch a perp. He orders him to stay put and gives him a real gun in case. Nick, however, enters the building and shoots a man who he believes is a criminal chasing Moss. Apparently only a bystander, Nick is terrified. Moss agrees to cover up the act, and urges him to leave town immediately.

Feeling guilty, Nick returns to the police station to confess, only to see that the "dead man" is actually a cop, laughing at him with everyone. Nick confronts Moss, who admits he choreographed the stunt to get him out of town, stating that Nick's panic, self-doubt, guilt, and anger are all part of being a "real" cop. Enraged with Moss, Nick punches him and furiously leaves.

Nick later stumbles into a confrontation between Moss and The Party Crasher, during which he saves Moss's life. The Party Crasher is wounded, taken to an ambulance, but he kills several people and escapes. Nick briefly captures him, radioing their location before he is knocked out. Susan visits Moss, stating that being a cop will never allow them to have a secure relationship, so she breaks up with him.

Moss is then visited by Nick, who predicts that The Party Crasher will follow typical revenge plot and will seek out Moss's loved ones in the third act of their story together. Nick is right, and Susan is abducted. Moss and Nick confront him on the billboard advertising Nick's latest movie Smoking Gunn II, and a brawl ensues. Nick saves Susan and Moss from being shot, but is himself shot in the chest. Moss pushes the Party Crasher off to his death, and tries to comfort Nick as he is taken to the hospital.

Months later, Nick has recovered and filmed The Good, the Badge and the Ugly. Moss, now married to Susan, attends the movie's premiere with the rest of the department as honored guests. He is annoyed to discover that Nick's best lines in the film are his, while he gets no credit.

Cast

Production

Development and writing
The project was first reported in early 1988, with Arthur Hiller attached to direct. In June of that year, it was announced that Hiller had been replaced by John Badham, who signed a multi-picture deal with Universal. The original screenplay by Lem Dobbs was significantly reworked by Daniel Pyne, who also performed rewrites on Fox's next movie Doc Hollywood. Aspects of the characters were influenced by 1941's Sullivan's Travels.

The film was originally set in Chicago, and was going to be the first production of a new outfit formed by Badham and his partner Rob Cohen, simply called The Badham/Cohen Group. However, Michael J. Fox's prior commitment to the Back to the Future sequels meant that this film had to be switched around with Bird on a Wire.

To prepare for his role, James Woods followed his quasi-homonym, NYPD lieutenant James Wood, on the job, wearing a bulletproof vest. Wood had previously been shadowed by Treat Williams and Robert De Niro in preparation of Prince of the City and Midnight Run, respectively. The latter recommended him for The Hard Way. Wood was also present during production, and requested a few changes for more realism, such as in the way a prisoner was able to escape custody. As Pyne had already moved on to his next movie, Jeff Reno and Ron Osborn contributed the script's final rewrites, but were not officially credited.

Casting
Ted Danson and Jack Nicholson were approached to star in the film early on. A pairing of Kevin Kline and Gene Hackman was also considered. When Michael J. Fox signed on, he was the one who suggested James Woods to co-star. The film's police consultant, Lieutenant Wood, recommended some roles be recast with people of color to better reflect the ethnic makeup of New York City law enforcement. Among those was Billy, played by James "LL Cool J" Smith, who made his true acting debut in the film (he had briefly appeared as himself in Krush Groove and Wildcats). His participation originally came in a package deal with the use of his music, and was going to be a single-line cameo, before it was expanded by Badham and Cohen. Smith had no particular expectation of a continued acting career at the time.

Filming
The film was shot in the New York region, where it is mostly set, in thirteen weeks between late May and late August 1990. The cinema setpiece was staged at the historic Beacon Theatre on Broadway. Fox's Malibu house was in fact located in nearby Deal, New Jersey. Producer Rob Cohen served as a second unit director. Woods tore his rotator cuff when he fell off the truck during the filming of the chase seen at the beginning of the film.

Release

Box office
The Hard Way opened in the United States on March 8, 1991, debuting at number 3 behind The Silence of the Lambs and New Jack City. The film ended its domestic run with a lackluster gross of $25.9 million. Woods blamed the The Hard Way'''s tepid audience reception on recent events in the Gulf War, which he thought had made the market unfavorable to a buddy comedy.

According to Box Office Mojo, the film was more successful in international markets, taking in an additional $38,7 million, for a worldwide theatrical gross of $65.6 million (approximately $148 million when adjusted for inflation in 2023).

Critical reception
, on Rotten Tomatoes, the film had a 74% approval rating from 23 critics, with an average rating of 5.8/10. The consensus said, "The Hard Ways overly familiar formula is enlivened by a witty script and the excellent comedic chemistry between Michael J. Fox and James Woods."

Vincent Canby of The New York Times said that it is "not a perfect comedy by any means, but it is a very entertaining one" and commended its "pure Hollywood" sensibility, writing that it is "sometimes slapdash in execution and sloppy in coherence, but it's written, directed and performed with a redeeming, self-mocking zest."Time Out called it a "light, bright comedy" that "counterbalances Hollywood convention with some very funny swipes at the film industry" and stated, "Badham handles the numerous action sequences with confidence, but the real enjoyment comes from the interplay between the two leads, who revel in the opportunity to send up their images."

Roger Ebert of the Chicago Sun-Times gave it three-and-a-half out of four stars and praised its "comic energy", calling the film "funny, fun, exciting, and [...] an example of professionals who know their crafts and enjoy doing them well." Ebert said the stunts, special effects, and second unit work  were "all seamless and exciting", and viewed that the actors elevate the film's plot with their performances:

Ty Burr of Entertainment Weekly gave the film a C rating and criticized it as having "coyly self-conscious high concept", writing that "takes the [action-buddy-cop genre] to such a numbing dead end." Burr panned its chase scenes and editing as "visual nonsense" and called its plot "all guns and gag lines", although he found Fox "secure enough to goof on his own image and inventive enough to do it well".

Post release
Home video
MCA/Universal Home Video released the film domestically on home video. The VHS' street date was September 12, 1991, while the LaserDisc arrived one week later. The Hard Way was released on DVD on November 17, 1998, by Universal Home Video. Kino Lorber issued the film on Blu-ray in the U.S. on October 6, 2020. That edition featured a new audio commentary from Badham and Cohen. However, Universal had previously given the film a first-party Blu-ray release in the U.K. on October 5, 2015.

Television
NBC promoted the film's world television premiere as part of the November 1992 sweeps. It was shown in primetime on Sunday, November 8, drawing a 11.4 rating and a 17 audience share. Unusually for network TV, it was re-run by NBC the next Friday evening, drawing a 7.4 rating and a 13 share.

Soundtrack
The film score was composed and conducted by Arthur B. Rubinstein. It was released on LP, CD and cassette by Varèse Sarabande.
The song Mama Said Knock You Out by LL Cool J featured as diegetic music in the film, and later during the end credits. One version of the song's music video incorporates footage from The Hard Way'', and was included on some disc-based editions of the film.

References

External links

 
 
 
 

1991 action comedy films
1990s buddy comedy films
1990s buddy cop films
1990s police comedy films
1991 films
American action comedy films
American buddy comedy films
American buddy cop films
American police detective films
Fictional portrayals of the New York City Police Department
Films about actors
Films about filmmaking
Films directed by John Badham
Films scored by Arthur B. Rubinstein
Films set in New York City
Films shot in New York City
Films with screenplays by Lem Dobbs
Universal Pictures films
Films set in a movie theatre
1990s English-language films
1990s American films